A Birder's Guide to Everything is a 2013 independent film starring Kodi Smit-McPhee, Alex Wolff, Michael Chen, Katie Chang, James Le Gros, Daniela Lavender and Sir Ben Kingsley. It was written by Rob Meyer and Luke Matheny and directed by Rob Meyer. The film had its world premiere at the Tribeca Film Festival on April 21, 2013, and was released in a limited release and through video on demand on March 21, 2014, by Screen Media Films and Focus Features.

Premise
The film follows the story of teenage birders who go on a road trip to find the (possibly) extinct Labrador duck. It was based on Rob Meyer's short film "Aquarium" which won an Honorable Mention at Sundance in 2008. Kenn Kaufman was an ornithological consultant and appears in the film at approximately 74 minutes.

Cast
 Kodi Smit-McPhee as David Portnoy
 James LeGros as Donald Portnoy
 Daniela Lavender as Juliana Santos
 Katie Chang as Ellen Reeves
 Alex Wolff as Timmy Barsky
 Zandi Holup as Evelyn Reed
 Michael Chen as Peter Nessbaum
 Tobias Campbell as Rob Lindau
 Joel Van Liew as Mr. Edbrooke
 Daniel G.S. Berger as Scarsdale High School Capt
 Ben Kingsley as Lawrence Konrad

Release
The film had its world premiere at the Tribeca Film Festival on April 21, 2013. Shortly after it was announced Screen Media Films and Focus Features had acquired distribution rights to the film. The film went on to screen at the Austin Film Festival on October 26, 2013. and was released in a limited release and through video on demand on March 21, 2014.

Reception
The film opened to very positive reviews from critics. It holds a 90% on Rotten Tomatoes, based on 21 reviews. The New York Times described it as a "smart, likeable, coming of age film [...] an eye opener for anyone who takes the everyday natural world for granted." USA Today wrote that "not since Rob Reiner's Stand by Me has such a compelling rite-of-passage film emerged."

The Guardian wrote that "you don't have to be a birder to enjoy it. The movie shows that seeking the rare and elusive is often more than just a physical quest; it also is a spiritual journey that changes the seeker."

References

External links
 

2013 films
2010s English-language films